The Journal of Competition Law & Economics (print: ,) is a quarterly peer-reviewed law journal dedicated to competition law and economics, published by Oxford University Press. The journal was established in March 2004. The first issue was published in March 2005. The editors are J. Gregory Sidak (Criterion Economics), and Damien Geradin (Covington & Burling).

External links

See also 
 List of law journals

References

British law journals
Law and economics journals
Works about competition law
Publications established in 2004
Oxford University Press academic journals
English-language journals